The 10th Golden Bell Awards was held on 26 March 1974 at the Armed Forces Cultural Center in Taipei, Taiwan. The ceremony was hosted by Fredrick Chien.

Winners

References

1974
1974 in Taiwan